Bir ("one" in Turkish), is an album released by Turkish girl group Hepsi in April 2005. To date, the album has sold over 149,000 copies. It is ranked number 19 among the best-selling albums of 2005 in Turkey. Music videos have been produced for their debut single "Olmaz Oğlan", "Yalan", "Herşeye Rağmen" and "Üç Kalp".

Track listing

References

Hepsi albums
2005 debut albums